Southburn is a hamlet in the East Riding of Yorkshire, England, it forms part of the civil parish of Kirkburn.

From 1890 until 1954 Southburn was served by Southburn railway station on the Selby to Driffield Line.

Murder of Shane Gilmer

Humberside Police were alerted to a disturbance at about 9.20 pm on Friday 12 January 2018. On entering the property at  9.58 pm officers found  Mr. Gilmer with serious injuries to his right arm and a crossbow wound to his torso. His pregnant girlfriend Laura Sugden was found at a nearby neighbours house with injuries to her head and neck. Mr. Gilmer died at 0.17 am on Saturday 13 January 2018 in Hull Royal Infirmary. The Police released a statement on Friday evening which stated a crossbow had been found at the property of Mr. Gilmer and Ms. Sugden. Humberside Police issued an arrest warrant for Anthony Lawrence who was also known as Tony Howarth, this named individual lived next door to Mr. Gilmer and Ms. Sugden. Humberside Police on Monday 15 January 2018 stated they had found a body during the hunt for Anthony Lawrence.

References

External links

"Kirkburn: Geographical and Historical information from the year 1892 (Bulmers')" (includes Southburn), Genuki.org.uk. Retrieved 16 April 2012

Villages in the East Riding of Yorkshire